Gun Brynhild Svensson, née Nilsson, (born 10 July 1937) is a Swedish politician and blogger. She was born in Stensele and is a Pirate Party member and blogs under the name Farmor Gun i Norrtälje. In 2009, she won "Stora bloggpriset" in the category Politics and Society. And in the 2010 Swedish General elections she was a candidate for the Riksdagen for the Pirate Party.

Svensson was a member of the Social Democrats until 1986 when she decided to leave the party. In 2006, she decided to start a blog, mostly about news and politics, and it also coincided with her new interest in human rights and the internet.

References

External links 

Living people
1937 births
Swedish bloggers
Swedish women bloggers
Pirate Party (Sweden) politicians
Swedish Social Democratic Party politicians
21st-century Swedish women politicians